Michael Janisch (21 July 1927 – 29 November 2004) was an Austrian actor. He in best known as Inspektor Fichtl in Tatort.

Partial filmography

  (1951) - Ferry
 Anna Louise and Anton (1953) - Hollack - Chauffeur
 Daughter of the Regiment (1953) - Karl
 Franz Schubert (1953) - Bergmann
  (1954) - Gendarmerie-Postenkommandant
 Maxie (1954)
 The Last Ten Days (1955)
 Her First Date (1955) - Taxichauffeur
 His Daughter is Called Peter (1955) - der Autofahrer
 A Girl Without Boundaries (1955) - Olaf Haagerlund
  (1955) - Oberleutnant Griefer
 Wilhelm Tell (1956) - Konrad Baumgarten
  (1957) - Johnny
 Eva küßt nur Direktoren (1958)
 Einmal noch die Heimat seh'n (1958) - Robert
 The Journey (1959) - Russian Officer lighting Paul Kedes' cigarette (uncredited)
 Auf allen Straßen (1959) - Carlo Carlotti, ehem. Fahrradclown
 Der Schatz vom Toplitzsee (1959)
 Frauen in Teufels Hand (1960) - Hauptmann Balke
 The Good Soldier Schweik (1960) - Russian Soldier Ballun
  (1960) - Jannis
 Miracle of the White Stallions (1963) - Refugee Leader
 An Alibi for Death (1963) - Martin Siebeck
 Die ganze Welt ist himmelblau (1964)
 Heidi (1965) - Johann
 Killer's Carnival (1966) - Kurt Waldeck (Vienna segment) (uncredited)
 Und Jimmy ging zum Regenbogen (1971) - Clairon
 The Vampire Happening (1971) - Handwerker
  (1972) - Polizist Dr. Lambrecht
 Der letzte Werkelmann (1972) - Holländer
 Trip to Vienna (1973) - Major Kopp
 The Girl from Petrovka (1974) - Police Chief Valinikov
 Four of the Apocalypse (1975) - Altaville Townsman (uncredited)
 Ich will leben (1976) - Antiquitätenhändler
  (1977)
 The Standard (1977) - Orbeliani
 The Fifth Musketeer (1979) - Hauptmann der Gefängniswache
 Die Erben (1983)
 Tödliche Liebe (1995)

References

External links 

1927 births
2004 deaths
Austrian male television actors
Austrian male film actors
Male actors from Vienna
Recipients of the Decoration of Honour for Services to the Republic of Austria